Jonathan Marray and Jamie Murray were the defending champions, but decided not to participate.
Facundo Bagnis and Federico del Bonis defeated 1st seeds Rogério Dutra da Silva and João Souza 6–2, 6–1 in the final.

Seeds

Draw

Draw

External links
 Main Draw

Challenger ATP de Salinas Diario Expreso - Doubles
2011 Doubles